Chandler C. Cohagen  (April 24, 1889 - December 9, 1985) was an American architect who designed around 200 buildings in the state of Montana, including the current Montana Governor's Residence.

Early life
Cohagen was born on April 24, 1889, in Pierson, Iowa near Sioux City. He was educated in Le Mars, Iowa, and he moved to Billings, Montana with his family in 1907. He graduated from the University of Michigan in 1915. While he was at UM, he co-founded the Alpha Rho Chi fraternity.

Career
Cohagen became an architect in Great Falls, Montana in 1915, when he co-founded the firm of Mclver, Cohagen and Marshall with Angus Vaughn McIver and Walter Vancleve Marshall. He spent most of his life in Billings, where he served on the city council from 1925 to 1927.

Cohagen designed around 200 buildings in Montana over the course of his career. In 1930, he redesigned the Oliver Building, which is listed on the National Register of Historic Places. He designed the new and current Montana Governor's Residence in 1959.

Cohagen became a fellow of the American Institute of Architects in 1951.

Personal life and death
Cohagen married Flora J. Brown in 1917, and she died in 1958. A Freemason, he was a member of the Order of DeMolay and the Grand Lodge of Montana.

Cohagen died on December 9, 1985, in Billings, Montana. His papers are held in the Montana State University Library in Bozeman, Montana.

References

1889 births
1985 deaths
People from Woodbury County, Iowa
People from Billings, Montana
University of Michigan alumni
Architects from Montana
20th-century American architects
Fellows of the American Institute of Architects